Chojniczanka Chojnice is a Polish football club located in Chojnice, Poland. It currently plays in I liga. The team's colors are yellow, white and red.

Current squad

Out on loan

References

External links
 
 Chojniczanka Chojnice (90minut.pl) 

Association football clubs established in 1930
1930 establishments in Poland
Chojnice County
Football clubs in Pomeranian Voivodeship